Danyil Serhiyovych Alefirenko (born 19 April 2000) is a Ukrainian professional football forward who plays for Chornomorets Odesa.

Career
Born in Kharkiv, Alefirenko is a product of the Metalist Kharkiv youth sportive school system.

In July 2017, he was signed by Zorya Luhansk and he made his debut for this club as a second half-time substituted player in the winning home match against FC Inhulets Petrove on 11 April 2021 in the Ukrainian Premier League.

References

External links
 
 

2000 births
Living people
Footballers from Kharkiv
Ukrainian footballers
Ukrainian Premier League players
FC Zorya Luhansk players
Association football forwards
Ukraine youth international footballers
Ukraine under-21 international footballers